Area codes 801 and 385 are telephone area codes in the North American Numbering Plan (NANP) serving Salt Lake City and the four surrounding counties of the Wasatch Front in north-central Utah. The numbering plan area comprises Davis, Morgan, Salt Lake, Utah, and Weber counties. Besides Salt Lake City,
major towns and cities within the area are Alta, American Fork, Bountiful, Layton, Lehi, Murray, Ogden, Orem, Provo, Sandy, South Jordan, Spanish Fork, Taylorsville, West Jordan, and West Valley City.  This numbering plan area is located in the Mountain Time Zone. Area code 801 is one of the original North American area codes created in 1947. Area code 385 was assigned to the same area in 2008, creating an overlay numbering plan.

History
The state of Utah was a single numbering plan area, assigned area code 801, when the American Telephone and Telegraph Company (AT&T) devised the first nationwide telephone numbering plan in 1947.

On September 21, 1997, area code was 801 restricted to the Wasatch Front, while the rest of Utah was assigned area code 435, causing 801 to become an enclave area code and also became one of the six pairs of doughnut area codes in the numbering plan. This split was originally intended to be a long-term solution. However, the Wasatch Front is not only home to most of Utah's landlines, but also the great majority of its pagers, cell phones and fax machines. As a result, 801 was close to exhaustion once again within only two years.  

In 2000, the Public Service Commission of Utah (PSC) approved a split for 801 to take effect in 2001, in which Salt Lake County would have retained the 801 area code and the rest of the Wasatch Front would have been assigned area code 385. Conservation measures, such as number pooling, postponed the split for more than seven years.

In July 2007, the PSC announced that the capacity created by the conservation measures would be exhausted by June 2008, finally necessitating the implementation of area code 385. The same announcement stated that 385 would be implemented as an overlay rather than a split, so that the Wasatch Front would be served by both area codes. Everyone who already had an 801 number could keep it. 385 entered service on June 1, 2008, with a year-long permissive dialing period beginning during which seven and ten-digit calls could be completed. Ten-digit dialing became mandatory along the Wasatch Front on June 1, 2009. As new wireless devices have become prominent over new landline adoption, outside abandoned 801 numbers being placed back into the pool, most new numbers have been assigned the 385 area code.

See also
List of NANP area codes

References

External links

List of exchanges from AreaCodeDownload.com, 801 Area Code
List of exchanges from AreaCodeDownload.com, 385 Area Code

801
801
Telecommunications-related introductions in 1947
Telecommunications-related introductions in 2009